South Dennis is an unincorporated community located within Dennis Township in Cape May County, New Jersey, United States. It is part of the Ocean City Metropolitan Statistical Area. Its postal ZIP Code is 08245. The post office was established in 1873, with Robert Hutchinson as the first postmaster.

Demographics

As of the 2000 United States Census, there were 93 people and 41 households residing in the ZIP Code Tabulation Area 08245. The population density was 930 people per square mile.

Geography
South Dennis is located at  (39.099980, -74.848733). It lies 10 ft (3 m) above sea level. According to the United States Census Bureau, ZIP Code 08245 has a total area of 0.3 km (0.1 mi), all of which is land. Dennis Creek serves as the northern border of the community.

Climate
South Dennis lies on the cusp of a humid subtropical climate zone and experiences four discernible seasons. In January 1942, South Dennis experienced its lowest recorded temperature at -22 °F, while the hottest temperature was 103 °F in July 1993.

Infrastructure

Transportation

South Dennis lies at the intersection of Route 47 (known as Delsea Drive) and Route 83. A major infrastructure project that realigned Route 47 and added a traffic light was completed in July 2007 at a cost of $6.7 million. Two county routes, County Route 628 and County Route 657, terminate shortly after entering South Dennis.

Fire services

Education
As with other parts of Dennis Township, the area is zoned to Dennis Township Public Schools (for grades K-8) and Middle Township Public Schools (for high school). The latter operates Middle Township High School.

Countywide schools include Cape May County Technical High School and Cape May County Special Services School District.

Notable people

People who were born in, residents of, or otherwise closely associated with South Dennis include:
 Richard S. Leaming (1828-1895), ship builder and politician who served in both the New Jersey General Assembly and the New Jersey Senate and on the Cape May County Board of Chosen Freeholders.

References

External links

The Cape May County Gazette – Local community newspaper
The Beachcomber

Dennis Township, New Jersey
Unincorporated communities in Cape May County, New Jersey
Unincorporated communities in New Jersey